Oreolalax rhodostigmatus (Guizhou lazy toad or red-spotted toothed toad) is a species of amphibian in the family Megophryidae. It is endemic to central and south-central China where it can be found in Hubei, Sichuan, Guizhou, and Hunan provinces.
While its distribution is relatively wide, it is known from only few locations. Its natural habitats are limestone caves in forested habitats. Breeding takes place in springs and stream pools inside the limestone caves. It is threatened by habitat loss and locally by collection for food (tadpoles).

Tadpoles are particularly large,  in length.

References 

rhodostigmatus
Cave amphibians
Amphibians of China
Endemic fauna of China
Amphibians described in 1979
Taxonomy articles created by Polbot